The following is a list of characters from the Area 88 franchise by Kaoru Shintani.

Characters

Main

Shin Kazama

A Japanese pilot who was supposed to be employed at Yamato Air Lines (YAL), Shin was tricked into fighting for the Asranian air force in the country's civil war by his friend, Satoru Kanzaki, by letting him place his signature in an Asranian military sign up sheet after getting him drunk at a local bar. Shin became the top ace at Area 88, though he gradually felt his humanity slipping as his time at the Area passed.
Because of this, he was cold to most of the people inside Area 88; he would make friends with Mickey Simon, Kim Aoba, Kitori Palvanaff, Roundell and his commanding officer, Saki Vashtar. All his aircraft (which include an F-8 Crusader, an F-5E, F-20A, and a Saab J-35 Draken) sported a flaming unicorn head painted on the tail. Determined to survive the war without losing his humanity, Shin's principal motivation is to save enough money to buy out his contract.

Mickey Simon

An Ex-US Navy American pilot and Vietnam War Veteran who signed up to fight for the Asranian government in its civil war after serving in the Vietnam War with the VF-33 Starfighters in the OVA and VF-96 Fighting Falcons aboard the USS Enterprise in the series. Addicted to the life of combat pilot, Mickey is unable to adjust to life at home. The self-proclaimed "number-two" pilot in Area 88, he was Shin's closest friend in the war, and is found in all three incarnations of the series. In the English-language comic version, he flies an F-100 Super Sabre at first, eventually moving up to a Grumman F-14 Tomcat. Flashbacks show him flying an F-4J Phantom II for the US Navy. The insignia found on his plane is a rabbit head resembling the Playboy bunny, similar to the "Black Bunny" tail art sported by VX-4 Evaluators (and its successor, VX-9 Vampires). He is spotted reading "Playgirl" magazine in episode 12. In the manga series, Mickey dies in the final attack after trying to save Seilane from the wreck of her fighter.

Saki Vashtar
A member of the royal family and a commissioned officer (Lt. Colonel) in the Asranian air force, he is distinguishable by his black shades (which in the manga was due to an eye injury), long hair, and an X-shaped scar on his forehead. Saki is the son of Abdael, the eldest son of the late former king of Asran. Asran was, at the time, the only middle eastern country not exporting its oil. Saki's grandfather did not wish to sell out to the West or to Communists and suspected that Abdael was dealings with both sides. For this reason, on his deathbed, he declared his younger son, Zak, the next king. Humiliated, Abdael became leader of an anti-government rebel force backed by various communist countries. Saki, remained loyal because of his late mother's love for Asran and is Area 88's commanding officer, though it is clear that Saki feels shame for betraying his own father and perceives that his late mother would be saddened by his father's actions. The scar on his forehead is self-inflicted as a symbol of this shame. (In the English-language comic, Saki scarred himself early in the war when, as a commander of Asran's regular Air Force, he allowed himself to be tricked by his father - allowing anti-government forces to successfully attack Saki's base.) Saki appears in all three versions. He is the cousin of Kitori Palvanaff. Though not incompetent, Saki is not exactly considered an outstanding leader by the pilots but they follow his orders for the most part simply because it's what they are paid to do - and if they don't he will either dock their pay or shoot them. Although shown as a capable pilot in the manga and OVA series by efficiently flying the Kfir, Saki is leading the force from  the control tower in the TV series.
He is named after Saki's Sredni Vashtar.

Ryoko Tsugumo
The daughter of CEO Tsugumo of Yamato Air Lines (YAL), she met Shin and Satoru when she was introduced to flying airplanes for the first time. Ryoko became infatuated with Shin before he left for Paris to conduct his pilot training. She became furious at Satoru when she found out that Shin was forced to serve in the Asranian air force against his will, refusing Satoru's wishes for them to get together. In the TV series, Ryoko agrees to marry Satoru after being shown proof that Shin died in a plane crash in Asran. However, she bolts on the day of their wedding when Makoto comes clean and give her a photo of Shin's F-5 jet. In the manga and OAV series, she consents to let Kanzaki have his way with her sexually if he will buy her YAL stocks at full price, allowing her to raise enough money to buy out Shin's contract. She is saved from doing so when police come to the hotel room to arrest Kanzaki on several accounts concerning recent scandals involving the carrier.

Satoru Kanzaki
Shin's closest friend from their days in an orphanage. Satoru worked alongside him at Yamato Airlines, but jealousy at seeing Shin going out with the company CEO's daughter prompts him to trick Shin while drunk into signing a contract for another flight that turns out to be a contract for the Asranian military - hoping that Shin will die in battle. CEO Tsugumo picked him to be his successor in Yamato Air Lines and arranged for him to marry Ryoko. In the manga, Tsugumo is forced to resign by shareholders when Kanzaki makes an underhanded purchasing deal with a shady jumbo jet manufacturer, assuring himself a large percentage of stock which installs him as the new YAL president. The jets turn out to be defective, causing an accidental crash which kills all aboard, thus opening Kanzaki to investigation. In the end, his wedding plans are ruined when Ryoko learns Shin's whereabouts after meeting Saki Vashtar and he is arrested for embezzlement, tax evasion, and his involvement in the plane crash. The arrest is hardly the end of Kanzaki as he returns with a number of schemes until the end of the manga series where he dies in an air duel with Shin. He is simply arrested in the OVA series. Kanzaki's backstory remains the same in the TV series, where he even fails a senior 747 captain's examination for a long-distance flight to Tokyo without autopilot after he almost collides with Shin, who was out on a test flight of his new F-20. His fate is left unresolved after Ryoko escapes on their wedding day.

Freelancers

Kim Aba
A young pilot from an African nation, he was mocked by most of the base's freelance pilots and other personnel because of his age. Saki, Roundell, Mickey, Kitori and Shin regard the boy as someone that they can rely on in a matter of crisis, consider Kim as a friend and a good pilot. Kim only appears in the manga and 2004 anime; in the latter, his emblem consisted of a red swan with golden wings, and flies the AV-8 Harrier II.

Morris
 An American pilot briefly seen in the Eclipse series. Morris is a skilled ground attack pilot flying a T-6 Texan, a single-engined prop-driven plane used to train pilots in World War II, and the oldest warplane on the base. Strongly urged to get a jet, he prefers the familiarity of the Texan. Ironically, his preference saves the base from nuclear attack by the anti-government forces. As the enemy missile approaches, the runways are suddenly covered by swarms of locusts, preventing the jet-powered planes from flying. Morris's Texan is able to launch and clear the runway - allowing others to launch and intercept the missile. Unfortunately, the Texan is disabled by the swarm nonetheless, and Morris is killed.

Mario Bandini
 A young Italian mercenary hungry for action but lacking any sense of teamwork. He arrives shortly after the onslaught of the Wolfpack, immediately making himself unwelcome. Skilled in aerobatics - a vet of the Frecce Tricolori - Bandini finds combat much more traumatic than he expected.

Greg Gates
A bearded Danish mercenary, he is noted by the base's mercenary force for being the only person who couldn't die, sometimes apparently oblivious or apathetic to the danger he faces. Greg serves as comedic relief and humor, as his actions lead him to trouble with his comrades and his officers, not to mention unintentionally making the civil war even worse. Pilots the A-10(OVA), and A-4 Skyhawk(2004 anime), Greg appears in all versions of Area 88.

Kitori Palvanaff
Only daughter of the King of Asran and cousin of Saki Vashtar, she was sent to Area 88 as the base's only female freelance pilot. She lived in Area 88 as one of the boys, fighting alongside them under the base's terms. She takes a liking for Kim for being the youngest freelancer to serve in the Asranian air force and loves to tease him. Later on, she also take a liking for Makoto as she finds him friendly. She was mystified with Shin's personality, finding him cold and alone, though the two are on good terms. Kitori only appears in the 2004 anime. Kitori sports an emblem consisting of three red arrows against a red bow, and flies a Mirage F1. She appears in the manga as Seirḗn Barnack (Sera), a rebel pilot with no connection with the Royal Family, who after meeting Shin, after both their plane have been shot down, develop feeling for the main character, while they are forced to collaborate in order to survive the desert. Later on, Sera was shot down again by Mickey and taken as POW, however after witnessing through uncensored newspapers about the latter descructions of the Rebel Army to Aslan, she decided to join Area 88 as mercenary pilot, starting a relationship with Mickey. However, in the final battle, Sera would have died with Mickey during an aerial combat.

Nguyen Van Com
A former pilot for the Republic of Vietnam Air Force. He encountered Mickey several times during the Vietnam War, and he was known as the "Shark of Tonkin Bay". He frequently argues with Shin, mainly because Shin shot down a friendly fighter whose pilot was blinded. Flying the F-105 Thunderchief, Nguyen enjoys the killing of enemy pilots, and even shoots an enemy pilot as he ejected from an aircraft. Despite his disagreements with Shin, he comes to respect him. He suffers the fate of the pilot he shot down, being shot as he ejected from an aircraft. Nguyen appears in the OVA and manga series but not in the Eclipse comic series.

Invulnerable Charlie
A pilot who once flew at Area 88. He returns because he was hired by Kanzaki to kill Shin. He uses the confusion caused by battle with the Wolf Pack to kill Shin. However, he is killed by birdstrike when a seagull slams into his cockpit and causes him to lose control. Shin is able to bail out from his plane and survive. Charlie appears in the manga and the OVA. The OVA English dub calls him Phoenix Charlie. Aspects of his character, however, are merged with Rocky for the character of Makoto Shingo in the 2004 TV series. In the Elipse comic, he is known as "Killer Charlie" and is killed dogfighting with Shin.

Bowman
Bowman initially gained Shin's dislike by shamelessly trying to borrow money from his fellow pilots so that he could pay the penalty for turning down a mission he was too scared to go on. Eventually he goes and returns only to brag about his kill record for that mission, ignoring the fact that it was at the cost of his wingman who was killed watching Bowman's back. Bowman appears in the manga, the Eclipse comic and the OAV although the OAV does not explore his character.

Hoover Kippenburg
A former pilot in the West German Air Force, a guilt-ridden Hoover joined after an accident while training rookie pilots. He flew too low and into the sun and this trainees, trying to follow, accidentally crashed into a mountain. Well liked by the other pilots, Hoover was temporarily entrusted with Saki's position as flight leader. Indeed, many of the pilots prefer Hoover over Saki in the position. Hoover only appears in the manga, including the Eclipse version.

Boris
A former British Royal Air Force pilot, Boris is haunted by the ghosts of his former wingmates. He is afraid to sleep with the lights off, for in his sleep, the ghosts of his dead comrades come to visit him in his dreams. In the OAV and the 2004 anime, Boris is shot down and killed by anti-aircraft fire. Boris and Shin are the only pilots in area 88 to fly the F-8 Crusader. Boris appears in all three versions.

Escape Killers
Three pilots of African (Black) descent, it was assumed that they came to Area 88 because the Central African conflicts pay so poorly. This trio of enigmatic pilots, seems to regard everyone at Area 88 with suspicion and keep to themselves. Shin, frustrated after a massive setback, plans to desert in the dead of morning only to encounter the three African pilots waiting for him. Mick appears, stating that he remembered stories about three Black pilots in Africa who specialize in hunting down deserters. Soon, the other Area 88 pilots defend Shin on the grounds that the Escape Killers are harassing an innocent person who could have just been taking an early morning walk. Saki and the other pilots convince the Escape Killers to leave. The Escape Killers were called Enforcers in the English translation of the manga. They also appeared in the OVA trilogy.

Jess
One of the Area 88 pilots in the OVA. Pilots a Kfir. Shin has to make an important choice when Jess cracks in the middle of a fight. He appears briefly but reflects Shin's change from sympathizer to hardened soldier.

Patrick Reed
Patrick is Mickey's wingman back in Vietnam. The Oklahoma native suffered a trauma during a dogfight when he hesitated to fire at an enemy MiG, which led to the development of a panicky dogfight style in which he will aileron roll while firing his guns (Like in a lot of media, the TV series erroneously refers to it as a barrel roll). Years after the Vietnam war, Patrick becomes a pilot for the enemy of the Kingdom of Asran. During a dogfight against Asran mercenaries, he was gunned down by Mickey. The two talked over the radio, and Patrick said (maybe not exact words), "Finally. I can go back home to Oklahoma to farm again." Then, Patrick dies, going down with his MiG-23 Flogger fighter in the desert.

Base personnel
Gustav
Head of the base's technician group. Supports the freelancers by doing field repairs to their jets before and after a sortie against the rebels. Gustav appears only in the 2004 anime.

McCoy
The base's scrounger and head of the Area 88's PX shop, deals with American dollars as a means of currency transaction. He provided the mercenaries with most of the items that they need such as fighter planes and weapons, with civilian items as well. McCoy's items are notorious for often being second hand and unreliable, particularly when he offers them at a discount. At one point, he admits selling spare parts scavenged from planes shot down near the base. McCoy appears in all version of Area 88.

Big Sammy
The codename used for the radar controllers of Area 88. Responsible for sending out tactical data of planes to the pilots and Saki.

Officers
Roundell
An old man of British descent, Major Roundell has his right eye replaced by an eyepatch. He serves as the base's executive officer and the confidant of Saki Vashtar. He is also an excellent fighter pilot, specialising in Low level assaults, flying the Blackburn Buccaneer with ease, at least in the 2004 remake. Roundell appears in all three versions of Area 88.

Others
Goh "Rocky" Mutsugi (Makoto Shinjo in the TV series)
A SO news reporter sent to Area 88 to cover the rumor of foreign freelance pilots fighting in the Asranian civil war, he was intrigued by Shin's presence as the only lone Japanese pilot to fight for the Asranian military. One of Rocky's photos, with Shin in the background, was seen by Ryoko in a magazine article on Asran and this convinced her that Shin was alive. He dies in the OVA rendition after he joins a pilot on a patrol, and is shot down. In the 2004 TV series, he survived the series and eventually confessed that his sponsor was Satoru Kanzaki because he wanted to get a photo of Shin's corpse as proof to Ryoko that he died in action, forcing her to marry him. However, he later help thwart the marriage. In the Eclipse comic, he survives being shot down, but is severely injured in the ordeal. Rocky travels the world, apparently having no ties back in Japan, telling the mercenaries that a photographer leaves nothing behind but his camera. Rocky appears (with different names, hair colors and physical builds) in all three versions of Area 88.

Prince Rishaal
Saki's younger brother. Rishaal's mother died giving birth to the prince, but Saki does not resent his brother for this, and in one pre-war flashback, the two are apparently close. Unlike Saki, Rishaal followed their father and went over to the anti-government forces, though his true loyalties remain unclear. When Mickey Simon is captured by anti-government forces, Rishaal arranges for his immediate release. In the Eclipse Manga, Rishaal is shown plans to destroy Area-88 using a bomb attached to a large subterranean drill. While seeming to approve the plan, he secretly intends to thwart it.

Taeko Yasuda
Mr. Tsugumo's secretary and Ryoko's confidant, she takes an immediate dislike and distrust to Kanzaki. She is attractive and intelligent, but also lonely - and in the Eclipse version, it's suggested that she is growing insecure about her age. In the manga and OAV, by happenstance, she sees the magazine article on Asran's civil war and the photo taken by the late Rocky, a photo in which Shin appears in the background. Taeko's friend pins down the location and deduces that Shin was at Area 88. Taeko also saves Ryoko from allowing Kanzaki to use her in a compromising position in order to have him willing to buy her stock share (at full price) and use the money to buy out Shin's contract. Taeko appears in all three versions, but is never specifically identified in the 2004 anime.

Giuseppe Farina
A Paris-based Mafia don whom Kanzaki requests to contract a hitman on Shin's life. It is through Farina that Charlie is hired as an assassin to return to Area 88. In return, Kanzaki would purchase airline parts from companies under Farina's control. Unfortunately for Kanzaki, Farina and Maxwell Corporation (the company with which Kanzaki dealt for the defective airbus), both plan to use Kanzaki as a fall guy in a takeover of Yamato airlines. Farina appears briefly in the OAV but does not seem to have no other involvement beyond the assassination attempt. In the manga, Farina has a much larger role and is later involved in supplying weapons to the Anti-Government forces. He does not appear at all in the 2004 TV series.

The Wolfpack
A rival mercenary squadron that is working for the anti government forces. They fly exclusively the Mig-23 and are considered a very serious threat to the Area 88 pilots. In the original manga, they cause a major setback by bombing Area 88 and destroying all of the pilot's planes and McCoy's warehouse. In the OAV, they attack Area 81 instead. In the Eclipse comic, where the Wolfpack's plane is identified as a "MiG-27D", both bases are attacked. Both instances, however, lead to a ferocious air battle in which the Wolfpack is ultimately defeated. There is no mention of the Wolfpack in the 2004 TV series, although a squadron of MiG-23s (led by Patrick Reed) did in fact appear to challenge the pilots of Area 88.

The Sniper
A lone gunman who is very effective with the use of his FR F2 rifle. He singlehandedly shuts down Area 88 operations with accurate fire on aircraft, equipment, and crew, but is finally defeated when his position is located and he is strafed by Shin's aircraft. His ultimate fate is left unknown, as his body is never found. He only appears in the 2004 TV series.

Cast

Area 88 (OVA)

Area 88 (TV)

References

Area 88